Saint-Langis-lès-Mortagne (literally Saint-Langis near Mortagne) is a commune in the Orne department in north-western France.

See also
Communes of the Orne department

References

External links

 Communes.com

Saintlangislesmortagne